Abdul Rahman Saleh may refer to:
Abdul Rahman Saleh (hero), a national hero of Indonesia
Abdul Rahman Saleh (prosecutor), former prosecutor general of Indonesia